James Monte Maloney (April 20, 1902 – March 7, 1962), known professionally as Jimmy Joy, was an American saxophonist, clarinetist, singer, and big band leader. His claim to fame was his ability to play two clarinets at the same time.

References

External links
 

American jazz saxophonists
American male saxophonists
American jazz clarinetists
American jazz singers
1902 births
1962 deaths
20th-century American singers
20th-century American saxophonists
20th-century American male musicians
American male jazz musicians